The FTSE MIB (Milano Indice di Borsa) (the S&P/MIB prior to June 2009)  is the benchmark stock market index for the Borsa Italiana, the Italian national stock exchange, which superseded the MIB-30 in September 2004. The index consists of the 40 most-traded stock classes on the exchange. The index was administered by Standard & Poor's from its inception until June 2009, when this responsibility was passed to FTSE Group, which is 100% owned by the Borsa Italiana's parent company London Stock Exchange Group.

Record values 
Both the intraday and closing high were 50,109.00 on 6 March 2000.

Annual returns 
The following table shows the annual development of the FTSE MIB, which was calculated back to 2003.

Components 
:

See also
 FTSE Italia Mid Cap

References

External links
Yahoo Finance page for FTSE MIB
 Components of the MIB index from Borsa Italiana

Italian stock market indices
FTSE Group stock market indices